Moknine is a town and commune in the Monastir Governorate, Tunisia.

See also
List of cities in Tunisia

References

External links

Populated places in Monastir Governorate
Communes of Tunisia